Harry Black (later titled Harry Black and the Tiger) is a 1958 British film adaptation of the  novel Harry Black by David Walker, released by 20th Century Fox.

The film stars Stewart Granger, Barbara Rush, Anthony Steel, and I. S. Johar in a BAFTA nominated role. It was shot in India.

Plot
Professional hunter Harry Black is in India. He wants to bag a tiger that is threatening a nearby village. As he proceeds on his journey, he encounters numerous people, including the young, and maybe too smart, Desmond Tanner and his wife Chris, who was Harry's past love.

Cast
 Stewart Granger as Harry Black 
 Barbara Rush as Christian Tanner 
 Anthony Steel as Desmond Tanner 
 I. S. Johar as Bapu 
 Martin Stephens as Michael Tanner 
 Frank Olegario as Dr. Chowdhury 
 Kamala Devi as Nurse Somola 
 John Helier as German Sergeant 
 Tom Bowman as British Officer 
 Allan McClelland as British Officer 
 Harold Siddons as British Officer 
 Norman Johns as British Officer 
 Gladys Boot as Mrs. Tanner 
 George Curzon as Mr. Philip Tanner 
 Archie Duncan as Woolsey 
 John Rae as Fisherman 
 Jan Conrad as Tower guard 
 Michael Seavers as Frenchman 
 André Maranne as Frenchman

Novel

The book was published in 1956. It was by David Walker, who had been an officer in the British army and an aide to John Buchan. Walker had emigrated to Canada.

The New York Times called it "a most intelligent novel". An obituary of Walker said " the symbolism and allegorical overtones helped raise it to the level of a kind of jungle Moby Dick."

Production
Film rights were purchased by 20th Century Fox in March 1956.

In July 1957 John Brabourne was assigned to produce, in part because he was son-in-law of Lord Mountbatten, former viceroy of India, and thus had many contacts in that country.

In August Fox announced Stewart Granger and Anthony Steel would star. At this stage of his career Granger was making movies primarily to finance the ranch he owned with then-wife Jean Simmons.

In September it was announced Sydney Boehm was writing the script. Boehm was promoted to producer at Fox but did not produce Harry Black.

Also in September Fox announced Hugo Frugonese would direct as the first of a three-picture contract with the studio.

Stewart Granger and Anthony Steel signed to play the lead roles. Brabourne cast IS Johar after hearing the actor speak at the London Indian Film Festival.

Filming began in India on 2 January 1958. Filming was completed by March. Don Sharp was in charge of second unit directing.

Reception
The Los Angeles Times called it a "most uncommonly intelligent and excellent film." The New York Times called it "slow, unconvincing and pretty dull."

Filmink said "The movie was a fine chance for Steel to reinvent himself, but he is unable to suggest the inner demons of his character. (As adventure tale, it is too slow, but is redeemed by location footage.)"

Kinematograph Weekly listed it as being "in the money" at the British box office in 1958.

References

External links
 
Review at Variety

1958 films
1950s adventure drama films
British adventure films
British drama films
Films based on Canadian novels
Films about hunters
Films set in India
Films shot in India
20th Century Fox films
CinemaScope films
Films directed by Hugo Fregonese
Films scored by Clifton Parker
Films about tigers
Canadian novels adapted into films
1956 Canadian novels
HarperCollins books
1958 drama films
1950s English-language films
1950s British films